Joe Rutherford (20 September 1920 – 27 December 1994) was a footballer who played as a goalkeeper in the Football League for Southport and Aston Villa.

Born in Fatfield, County Durham, Rutherford played as a youth for Chester-le-Street Schools, Chester-le-Street Juniors, Fatfield Juniors, Chester Moor Temperance, Ferryhill, Blyth Spartans and Chester-le-Street, and had trials at West Ham United and Reading, before joining Birtley Colliery. He joined Southport in October 1936.

Rutherford joined Aston Villa in February 1939 and played in 156 league and cup matches, retiring in 1951. During the Second World War, he played in several games as a guest, for Margate, playing one game in 1939–40, Solihull Town, Nottingham Forest, Lincoln City and Mansfield Town, but these are not counted in official league records and tallies.

References

External links

1994 deaths
1920 births
People from Fatfield
Footballers from Tyne and Wear
Footballers from County Durham
English footballers
Association football goalkeepers
English Football League players
Blyth Spartans A.F.C. players
Southport F.C. players
Aston Villa F.C. players
Nottingham Forest F.C. wartime guest players
Lincoln City F.C. wartime guest players
Mansfield Town F.C. wartime guest players